Harry Scoble (born 12 November 1994) is an Australian rugby union footballer who currently plays as a hooker for the  in the international Super Rugby competition.

Early career

Initially Scoble hailing from an AFL supporting family, Scoble was initially interested in playing AFL as a youngster, however by the age of 9 he had switched to rugby union and started making his way up through the grades playing for The University of Western Australia in his native Western Australia.   He represented both Western Australia and Australia at schoolboy and under-20 level as well as being a member of the Future Force program before being selected as a member of the Perth Spirit squad ahead of the inaugural National Rugby Championship in 2014.

Super Rugby career

After 2 years of consistent performances in the NRC, Scoble was named as part of the Western Force's wider training group ahead of the 2016 Super Rugby season. Injuries to first choice hookers Nathan Charles and Heath Tessmann saw Scoble thrust into the limelight as the franchise's starting number 2 for the second half of the campaign.

International

Scoble represented Australia at schoolboy level in 2011 and was a member of the Australia under-20 side which competed in the 2014 IRB Junior World Championship in New Zealand.

Super Rugby statistics

References

1994 births
Living people
Australian rugby union players
Rugby union hookers
Western Force players
Perth Spirit players
Rugby union players from Perth, Western Australia